The flag of Richmond, Virginia, was adopted in 1993. The flag contains a navy blue field in the upper two-thirds quadrant with two red and two white stripes beneath in the lower third of the flag. It features a silhouette of a person working a James River bateau down the James River. 

A city committee headed by Second District Councilman Benjamin A. Warthen brought forth the design, which was based on a proposal submitted by Michael Davis, a committee member and graphics designer at Heilig-Meyers Co. The new Richmond flag was carried by bateau to the dedication ceremony on Brown's Island on November 24, 1993.

Symbolism 

The boatman is a graphical depiction of a 14-foot tall bronze statue called "The Headman" that stands on Brown's Island and commemorates the African American contribution to Richmond's waterways. The nine stars on the flag represent the nine states that were once part of Virginia's territory: Virginia, West Virginia, Ohio, Kentucky, Minnesota, Illinois, Wisconsin, Michigan, and Indiana.

Reception
In a 2004 survey by the North American Vexillological Association, Richmond's city flag was ranked as the 15th best city flag in the U.S.

See also 
 Richmond, Virginia

References

External links
 Richmond, Virginia. Flags of the World. http://www.crwflags.com/fotw/flags/us-va-ri.html#des

Flag
Flags of cities in Virginia
Flags introduced in 1993
1993 establishments in Virginia